Best Fiends  is a popular mobile game and media franchise centered around tile-matching gameplay. Since it launched in 2014, the original Best Fiends game has had almost 100 million downloads as of August 2019.

Plot
Minutia was a peaceful land where the Fiends lived in peace. One day, a meteor struck Mount Boom, where the slugs who lived there turned into aggressive beasts, invading Minutia and kidnapping the Fiends and families. Temper, who was the only one who survived the attack, must go on a journey to rescue the Fiends, and travel throughout Minutia to reach Mount Boom, and stop the Slug invasion.

History
The original Best Fiends game was launched exclusively on iOS devices in 2014 by the gaming startup Seriously, which had been founded the previous year by several former Rovio executives. The company's goal was for Best Fiends to start as a game and eventually become a successful brand, as had previously happened with Rovio's app Angry Birds. As part of this strategy, Seriously launched a YouTube channel to produce short animated videos alongside the launch of the first Best Fiends game and recruited Heitor Pereira to compose orchestral music for the game. The Best Fiends animated videos were produced by Reel FX and featured voice acting from Mark Hamill. Within two weeks of its launch, Best Fiends had been downloaded 1.5 million times. 

The original Best Fiends game was the first in a trilogy. The second game, Best Fiends Forever, was launched in October 2016, the third game, Best Fiends Slugs, was soft-launched the following December, and the fourth game, Best Fiends Stars, was released in 2018.

References

External links

2014 video games
Tile-matching video games
IOS games
Android (operating system) games
Video games developed in Finland